Antoine V de Gramont (January 1672 – September 16, 1725), Duke of Guiche, was a Marshal of France.

Early life
French military figure and member of the House of Gramont, he was the oldest child of Antoine Charles IV de Gramont and Marie Charlotte de Castelnau (1648 – 29 January 1694), daughter of Marshal Castelnau.

Biography
At the age of thirteen, he became a musketeer and by 1687 he had become head of his regiment. He participated in the Siege of Philippsburg (1688) and the Battle of Landen (1693).  He was made brigadier in 1694 and served in Flanders.

In 1696, he was serving under Marshal Catinat and Marshal Boufflers, and was himself made a marshal (of Flanders) and Colonel General of Dragoons in 1702.  In 1704, he made lieutenant of the royal arms and on October 26, 1704, Colonel General of the French guards.  He became envoy to Philip V of Spain in 1705.  He was wounded at the Battle of Malplaquet (1709).

In 1712, he became Lieutenant General of Bayonne and Lieutenant General and Governor of Navarre and Béarn.  In 1715, he became Counselor of Regents and War and in 1720, acquired the title of Duke of Gramont.  In 1724, he became Marshal of France.  He died a year later, evidently in his palace.

Personal life
He had married Marie Christine de Noailles (1672-1648), daughter of Anne-Jules, 2nd duc de Noailles and his wife, 	Marie Françoise de Bournonville (1654-1748). They had 5 children. The second eldest child was:
 Louis de Gramont, 6th Duke of Gramont

Notes

References

1672 births
1725 deaths
Antoine 5
Dukes of Guiche
18th-century French diplomats
Marshals of France
18th-century peers of France
17th-century French people
People of the Regency of Philippe d'Orléans
People of the Ancien Régime